The Prince-Bishops' Castle is a castle in the municipality of Delémont of the Canton of Jura in Switzerland.  It is a Swiss heritage site of national significance. Nowadays, the castle hosts a primary school.

See also
 List of castles in Switzerland

References

Cultural property of national significance in the canton of Jura
Castles in the canton of Jura
Delémont